Ropeka (also Romanized as Ropekā; also known as Robegāh) is a village in Dar Pahn Rural District, Senderk District, Minab County, Hormozgan Province, Iran. At the 2006 census, its population was 267, in 55 families.

References 

Populated places in Minab County